Vaz-e Olya (also Romanized as Vāz-e ‘Olyā; also known as Vāz Bālā and Vāz-e Bālā) is a village in Natel-e Restaq Rural District, Chamestan District, Nur County, Mazandaran Province, Iran. At the 2006 census, its population was 265, in 68 families.

References 

Populated places in Nur County